László Régi (born 13 May 1911, date of death unknown) is a Hungarian international football player. He played for the club BKV Előre SC. He participated with the Hungary national football team at the 1936 Summer Olympics in Berlin.

References

External links

1911 births
Year of death missing
Footballers at the 1936 Summer Olympics
Olympic footballers of Hungary
Hungarian footballers
Association football goalkeepers